Night Hostess is a play written by Philip Dunning that premiered on Broadway on September 12, 1928, at the Martin Beck Theatre. The play, starring Gail De Hart, John L. Kearney, and Averell Harris, centered on the lounge of the "Little Casino," an exclusive gambling establishment in New York City.

Screen legend Katharine Hepburn (using the alias "Katharine Burns") made her Broadway debut in Night Hostess, playing the bit part of "Other Hostess".

American plays
1928 plays
Plays set in New York City